Fire on the Mountain is a 1962 novel by Edward Abbey.  It was Abbey's third published novel and followed Jonathan Troy and The Brave Cowboy.

Plot summary

Abbey includes the following paragraph to introduce this book:

The hero of the story is John Vogelin, a New Mexico rancher whose land is about to be condemned by the United States Air Force, who want to use his land to expand a bombing range.  He is the last holdout among the several people whose land the Air Force wants, and he refuses to move.  The story of his resistance to being thrown off his land and his death is told through the eyes of his grandson, who is visiting the ranch for the summer.

Criticism of government
The book is essentially a critique on the over-extension of government. Abbey makes an argument for limited government, more explicitly to limit government's ability to expropriate private land. However, Abbey still opposed the private sector from developing on natural lands, arguments which were explored in later books such as The Monkey Wrench Gang through the novel's antagonist, which put him at odds with aspects of these ideologies.

Adaptations
The novel was adapted into a 1981 television film of the same name, which was directed by Donald Wrye and written by John Sacret Young. The film received a Primetime Creative Arts Emmy Award nomination in 1982.

Singer-songwriter Laura Veirs wrote a song called "The Ballad of John Vogelin" from her 2003 studio album Troubled by the Fire.

References

1962 American novels
Novels by Edward Abbey
American novels adapted into films
Western (genre) novels
Novels set in New Mexico
American novels adapted into television shows